Merohister is a genus of clown beetles in the family Histeridae. There are about eight described species in Merohister.

Species
These eight species belong to the genus Merohister:
 Merohister aino (Lewis, 1884)
 Merohister arboricavi Johnson in Johnson, Lundgren, Newton, Thayer, Wenzel & Wenzel, 1991
 Merohister ariasi (Marseul, 1864)
 Merohister asoka (Lewis, 1910)
 Merohister jekekli (Marseul, 1857)
 Merohister jekeli (Marseul, 1857)
 Merohister osculatus (Blatchley, 1910)
 Merohister uenoi Ôhara, 1992

References

Further reading

 
 

Histeridae
Articles created by Qbugbot